"Frenchelon" is the nickname given to the signal intelligence system operated by France. The name is a reference to its Anglo-American counterpart ECHELON.

History 
Its existence has never been officially acknowledged by French authorities, although numerous journalists, based on military information, have mentioned it, since the European Parliament investigated ECHELON and also its implications in counter-terrorism. The term was coined by Kenneth Cukier, an American journalist living in Paris, in a paper presented at the Computers, Freedom and Privacy conference in 1999, and later in an op-ed in The Wall Street Journal Europe edition.

Operations 
The system is allegedly operated by DGSE, whose Direction Technique (Technical Direction) is responsible for signal intelligence. 
The largest station is in Domme, near Sarlat in Périgord. Some of the other stations in France are: Alluets-Feucherolles (Alluets-le-Roi), Mutzig (Alsace), Mont Valérien, Plateau d'Albion, Agde, Solenzara (South Corsica), and Filley Barracks in Nice.

There are some other stations in overseas territories and former colonies:
 Saint-Barthélemy
 Bouar, Central African Republic
 Djibouti (Camp Lemonnier - closed, now occupied by Combined Joint Task Force – Horn of Africa): new center built recently between French Air Force Base and French Foreign Legion camp in Djibouti.
 Mayotte (Closed in 1998)
 Réunion
 Kourou, French Guiana
 and base aeronavale La Tontouta in New Caledonia

These stations, in addition to the DGSE headquarters on boulevard Mortier in Paris, intercept and decipher electronic communications using software coded communications of diplomatic, military or industrial origin.

French newspapers recently indicated that DGSE had an interception program on submarine cables, similar to NSA ones. No official data indicates whether this could be a part of FRENCHELON.

It should not be confused with the French Army's official listening system Emeraude, which used to be mistakenly confused with Frenchelon.

References

Further reading

External links 
 Press review (in French)
 French spying (in French)
 War of information made in France (in French)

Directorate-General for External Security
Mass intelligence-gathering systems
Signals intelligence
Military of France
Science and technology in France